Thomas Cryps was a tax collector and the member of the Parliament of England for Marlborough for the parliaments of 1385, 1386, and 1399.

References 

Members of Parliament for Marlborough
English MPs 1385
Tax collectors
Year of birth missing
Year of death missing
English MPs 1386
English MPs 1399